Maro René Engel (born 27 August 1985) is a German professional racing driver based in Monaco. He is a long-time Mercedes-AMG factory driver, FIA GT World Cup  Champion, Nürburgring 24 hour winner, DTM race winner, Suzuka 10h winner, Macau GT Cup winner. currently racing in the Mercedes-AMG GT3 and in the FIA Formula E championship. He has previously raced in the DTM, V8 Supercars, F3000, F3 and Formula E.

Racing career

Early career 
Born in Munich, Maro competed in karting in Germany and France between 1996 and 1999 and finished 4th in the 2000 European
Junior Karting Championship. He then moved onto Formula BMW, finishing 3rd in the 2001 Junior Cup, before finishing 8th in Formula BMW ADAC the following year.

Formula Three (2003–2007) 
He moved onto Formula Three in 2003 as a factory Opel driver, and raced in the Recaro F3 Cup in 2004, and Italian Formula 3000 in 2005. He returned to F3 for the British series in 2006 and 2007, in 2006 receiving backing from Direxiv. In 2007 he was signed as a Mercedes-Benz Junior driving for Carlin Motorsport. He finished fifth with one victory in 2006, and was runner-up to Marko Asmer in 2007 with three wins.

Deutsche Tourenwagen Masters (2008–2011) 

He was signed by AMG Mercedes to drive a one-year-old car run by Mücke Motorsport in the Deutsche Tourenwagen Masters for the 2008 season. He remained with the team 2011 season. In four years racing in the category, he achieved a best result of sixth place at first round held at the Hockenheimring in 2009. He went on to finish the 2009 season in twelfth place over all, scoring eight points.

GT Racing (2012) 
After leaving DTM, Engel spent the 2012 year making several guest appearances in selected sports car racing championships worldwide as a member of the AMG Customer Sports team, winning the fifth round of the 2012 Australian GT Championship at the Phillip Island Grand Prix Circuit, driving a Mercedes-Benz SLS AMG GT3 prepared by Erebus Racing.

V8 Supercars (2013) 

Engel made his V8 Supercar debut in 2013, driving a Mercedes E63 AMG entered by Erebus Motorsport (formerly known as Stone Brothers Racing). Engel replaced Shane van Gisbergen as the driver of the No. 9 SP Tools entry. Engel had five race retirements. His best finish was a ninth place in a hastily prepared under developed car at the third race of the Darwin round; he finished last of the full-time drivers in the season championship.

Macau Grand Prix GT Cup (2013) 

Next to his commitments in V8 Supercar for Erebus Motorsport he competed in the 2013 Macau GT Cup with a Mercedes-Benz SLS AMG GT3 scoring pole position and a lap record in qualifying. Narrowly missing out on the victory due to sustaining a puncture on the front left while leading, 2 laps before the end.

GT Racing (2014) 
In 2014 Engel resumed his duties as a member of the AMG Customer Sports team racing exclusively with the Mercedes-Benz SLS AMG GT3.
Making his debut in the Bathurst 12 Hour racing for Erebus Motorsport together with Bernd Schneider (racing driver) and Nico Bastian Engel scored pole position with a lap record of 2min03.8586 and winning the inaugural Allan Simonsen Pole Position Trophy. The German trio dominated the race for 9 hours before an issue forced them to pit for repairs dropping them 7 laps down.
He participated in his first 24 Hours Nürburgring racing for German team ROWE Racing finishing the "Hardest race in the World" in 3rd place together with his teammates Nico Bastian Christian Hohenadel and Michael Zehe. 
Engel also competed in various VLN races for ROWE Racing winning the 9th round of the VLN championship. He also raced in the German ADAC GT Masters series for ROWE Racing.

Macau Grand Prix GT Cup (2014) 
Racing for the Mercedes-AMG Driving Academy team in a Mercedes-Benz SLS AMG GT3  Engel returned to Macau winning the 2014 Macau GT Cup ahead of his teammate Renger van der Zande scoring a very popular 1-2 win in the gambling capital against the strong competition of Audi, BMW, Porsche and other factory teams and drivers.

GT Racing (2015) 
Engel continued racing with and for the AMG Customer Sports team in the Mercedes-Benz SLS AMG GT3 as an Official Mercedes-AMG Performance driver. He joined team Black Falcon as the pro driver in the Blancpain GT Series Endurance Cup in Pro-AM with a best result of 2nd at the 1000 km Paul Ricard race. He also contested the Spa 24 Hours with team Black falcon where the team had a DNF. On the Nürburgring Engel continued to race with ROWE Racing winning one VLN race. He also participated in the Nürburgring 24 Hours but the team had to DNF the car after several punctures.

Engel was also part of the Mercedes-AMG drivers that assisted development of the new Mercedes-AMG GT3.

FIA GT World Cup (2015)
In 2015 the Macau GT Cup was recognised by the FIA as the FIA GT World Cup lifting its status to the world championship for GT3 cars. Engel returned with his Mercedes-AMG Driving Academy team in the successful Mercedes-Benz SLS AMG GT3. Engel won the 12 lap qualification race from third on the grid after Stefan Mücke was penalised for a Safety car procedure infringement. Starting from pole position in the 18 lap race around Macau's famous Guia circuit Engel won the race and was crowned the inaugural FIA GT World Cup Champion. Through Engel's victory combined with the 4th-place finish of his teammate Renger van der Zande Mercedes-Benz won the inaugural FIA GT Manufacturers World Cup.

LMPC IMSA Racing (2016) 
Engel joined Starworks Motorsport for the American Endurance sportscar classics 24 Hours of Daytona and 12 Hours of Sebring in their Oreca Prototype in the LMPC class. Engel is also due to compete in the 6 Hours of Watkins Glen and Petit Le Mans at Road Atlanta for Starworks later in the season.

GT Racing (2016) 
Racing for AMG Team Black Falcon in the new Mercedes-AMG GT3, Engel took overall victory at the Nürburgring 24 hours together with his teammates Bernd Schneider (racing driver) Adam Christodoulou and Manuel Metzger. Engel made the decisive pass to win the race on the last lap. His winning margin was the tightest in the history of the race with merely 5,6s separating the first two cars. Engel was also the first winner of the SCG Pole position trophy after scoring pole position for the Nürburgring 24 hour race in drying track conditions with a lap of 8 minutes 14.563 in the #9 Mercedes-AMG GT3 with which Engel also raced performing a double start and finishing the race in 4th position with this second car.

Following two victories in 2014 and 2015 in Macau, Engel finished 3rd at the 2016 FIA GT World Cup

Formula E 
In August 2016, Engel joined Venturi Grand Prix to make his debut in the 2016-17 season. In his second season Engel finished 12th in the driver standings, scoring a best result of 4th at the Paris ePrix.

Deutsche Tourenwagen Masters (2017)
In 2017, Engel rejoined the DTM with Mercedes-Benz taking his maiden DTM win at the Moscow raceway

Racing record

Career summary

† Guest driver ineligible to score points.
* Season still in progress.

Complete Formula Three Euro Series results
(key) (Races in bold indicate pole position) (Races in italics indicate fastest lap)

† Driver did not finish the race, but was classified as he completed over 90% of the race distance.

Complete Deutsche Tourenwagen Masters results
(key) (Races in bold indicate pole position) (Races in italics indicate fastest lap)

Supercars Championship results

Bathurst 1000 results

Complete IMSA SportsCar Championship results

† Engel did not complete sufficient laps to score full points.
* Season still in progress.

Complete Formula E results
(key) (Races in bold indicate pole position; races in italics indicate fastest lap)

Complete Bathurst 12 Hour results

Complete GT World Challenge Europe Sprint Cup results

Commitment 
Maro Engel is today a member of the 'Champions for Peace' club, a group of 80 famous elite athletes including Novak Djokovic and Sergey Bubka among others, committed to serving peace in the world through sport, created by Peace and Sport, a Monaco-based international organization.

References

External links 
 
 
 

1985 births
Living people
Racing drivers from Bavaria
Sportspeople from Munich
German racing drivers
Deutsche Tourenwagen Masters drivers
British Formula Three Championship drivers
Auto GP drivers
Formula BMW ADAC drivers
Supercars Championship drivers
Blancpain Endurance Series drivers
24 Hours of Spa drivers
Formula E drivers
24 Hours of Daytona drivers
24H Series drivers
Mercedes-AMG Motorsport drivers
Formula 3 Euro Series drivers
ADAC GT Masters drivers
Nürburgring 24 Hours drivers
WeatherTech SportsCar Championship drivers
Carlin racing drivers
Mücke Motorsport drivers
Rowe Racing drivers
Venturi Grand Prix drivers
International GT Open drivers
Durango drivers
Starworks Motorsport drivers
HWA Team drivers
Eifelland Racing drivers
Toksport WRT drivers
Craft-Bamboo Racing drivers